Admiral of the Fleet George Byng, 1st Viscount Torrington,  (27 January 1663 – 17 January 1733), of Southill Park in Bedfordshire, was a Royal Navy officer and statesman. While still a lieutenant, he delivered a letter from various captains to Prince William of Orange, who had just landed at Torbay, assuring the Prince of the captains' support; the Prince gave Byng a response which ultimately led to the Royal Navy switching allegiance to the Prince and the Glorious Revolution of November 1688.

As a captain, Byng saw action at the Battle of Vigo Bay, when the French fleet were defeated, during the War of the Spanish Succession. As a flag officer, he led the bombardment squadron while serving under Admiral Sir George Rooke at the Capture of Gibraltar and then took part in the Battle of Málaga at a later stage in the same war.

Byng was sent to the Mediterranean to thwart any attempt by the Spanish to take Sicily. He encountered the Spanish fleet at Naples and, after pursuing it down the Strait of Messina, sent ahead his fastest ships causing the Spanish fleet to split in two. In the ensuing action, known as the Battle of Cape Passaro, the Spanish fleet was devastated: 10 ships of the line were captured, four ships of the line sunk or burnt and four frigates were captured at this early and critical stage of the War of the Quadruple Alliance. He went on to be First Lord of the Admiralty during the reign of King George II.

Early career
Born the son of John Byng and Philadelphia Byng (née Johnson), Byng joined the Royal Navy as a King's Letter Boy in May 1678. He served initially in the fourth-rate  and then transferred to the fourth-rate  in November 1678 and to the fourth-rate  in June 1679. He sailed with the fifth-rate  to Tangier in Summer 1680 and, after a short period of military service with the 2nd Tangier Regiment, he rejoined the Royal Navy as a lieutenant on 23 February 1684 and assigned to the fourth-rate  before returning to HMS Phoenix in which he sailed to the East Indies on a mission to put down a rebellion in Bombay. He transferred to the fourth-rate  in May 1688 and to the third-rate  in September 1688.

In October 1688 Byng, still a lieutenant, delivered a letter from various captains to Prince William of Orange, who had just landed at Torbay, assuring the Prince of the captains' support; the Prince gave Byng a response which ultimately led to the Royal Navy switching allegiance to the Prince and the Glorious Revolution of November 1688. Promoted to captain on 22 December 1688, he was given command of the fourth-rate  before transferring to the command of the third-rate  in May 1690 in which he saw action at the Battle of Beachy Head in July 1690 during the Nine Years' War. He transferred to the command of the second-rate  in September 1690 and to the third-rate  in January 1691 before becoming Flag Captain to Admiral Edward Russell in the first-rate  in December 1693.

Byng was given command of the third-rate  in June 1702 and saw action at the Battle of Vigo Bay, when the French fleet were defeated, in October 1702 during the War of the Spanish Succession.

Senior command
Promoted to rear admiral on 1 March 1703, Byng became third-in-command of the Mediterranean Fleet under Admiral Sir Cloudesley Shovell with his flag in the third-rate  later that month. He led the bombardment squadron while serving under Admiral Sir George Rooke at the Capture of Gibraltar in August 1704 and then took part in the Battle of Málaga in August 1704. Knighted on 22 October 1704, and promoted to vice admiral on 3 January 1705, he was elected Member of Parliament for Plymouth later that year.

Byng became Commander-in-Chief, Portsmouth, with his flag in the first-rate HMS Royal Anne, in late 1705 and then took part in the bombardment of Alicante in June 1706. After taking part in the British defeat at the Battle of Toulon in July 1707 and, while sailing aboard his flagship HMS Royal Anne, Byng was present during the great naval disaster off the Isles of Scilly in October 1707 when Shovell and four of his ships were lost, claiming the lives of nearly 2,000 sailors.

Promoted to full admiral on 26 January 1708, Byng became Commander-in-Chief of the Mediterranean Fleet in January 1709 and went on to join the Board of Admiralty led by the Earl of Orford in November 1709. Byng was advanced to Senior Naval Lord on the Admiralty Board in October 1710. He stood down from the Admiralty Board in January 1714 but was reappointed, as Senior Naval Lord again, on Orford's return to the Admiralty in October 1714.

Byng took part in the suppression of the Jacobite rising by cutting off the Old Pretender's supplies in 1715 and for this he was created a baronet on 15 November 1715. In 1717 he was commanding the British fleet in the Baltic with full cooperation from Denmark's admiral Peter Raben.

He was promoted to Admiral of the Fleet on 14 March 1718 and, with his flag in the second-rate , he was sent out as Commander-in-Chief of the Mediterranean Fleet to thwart any attempt by the Spanish to gain or to consolidate their position in Sicily. He encountered the Spanish fleet at Naples and, after pursuing it down the Strait of Messina, sent ahead his fastest ships causing the Spanish fleet to split in two. In the ensuing action on 11 August 1718, known as the Battle of Cape Passaro, the Spanish fleet was devastated: 10 ships of the line were captured, 4 ships of the line sunk or burnt and 4 frigates were captured at this early and critical stage of the War of the Quadruple Alliance.

Byng was then given power to negotiate with the various princes and states of Italy on behalf of the English crown. Following his return to England, Byng became both Treasurer of the Navy and Rear-Admiral of Great Britain on 21 October 1720. He was admitted to the Privy Council on 3 January 1721 and, having stepped down from the Admiralty Board in September 1721, was created Baron Byng of Southill in the county of Bedford, and 1st Viscount Torrington in Devon on 21 September 1721. He developed his estate at Southill Park in Bedfordshire in the 1720s.

Byng was installed as a Knight Companion of the Order of the Bath on 17 June 1725 and appointed First Lord of the Admiralty during the Walpole–Townshend Ministry in August 1727; in this role he was instrumental in the establishment of the Royal Naval College at Portsmouth.

Marriage and progeny

Byng was married at St Paul's, Covent Garden, on 6 March 1691 to Margaret Master, daughter of James Master of East Langdon in Kent. Together the couple had fifteen children (eleven sons and four daughters) of whom six lived to survive him:
 Pattee Byng (1699–1747), 2nd Viscount Torrington, died without surviving progeny.
 George Byng (1701–1750), 3rd Viscount Torrington
 Robert Byng (1703–1740), Governor of Barbados (1739–1740), from whom the Earls of Strafford stem.
 John Byng (1704–1757), Admiral controversially court-martialled and shot at the outbreak of the Seven Years' War in Europe.
 Edward Byng (1706–1756)
 Sarah Byng (1695–1775)

Death and burial
Byng died on 17 January 1733 and was eventually buried in a vault within the newly constructed  Byng Mausoleum attached to the north side of the Church of All Saints in the parish of Southill, Bedfordshire, in which parish was situated his residence of Southill Park. The mausoleum was constructed for his burial, with licence granted by the Bishop of Lincoln in 1733.

References

Citations

Sources

Further reading

External links 

 George Byng (1663/64-1732/33) Three Decks
 

|-

|-

|-

|-

|-

|-

|-

|-

1663 births
1733 deaths
People from Wrotham
Royal Navy admirals of the fleet
Lords of the Admiralty
Viscounts in the Peerage of Great Britain
Knights Companion of the Order of the Bath
Members of the Privy Council of Great Britain
British naval commanders in the War of the Spanish Succession
Byng, George
Members of the Parliament of Great Britain for Plymouth
British MPs 1707–1708
British MPs 1708–1710
British MPs 1710–1713
British MPs 1713–1715
British MPs 1715–1722
18th-century Royal Navy personnel
George
Soldiers of the Tangier Garrison
People from Southill, Bedfordshire
Members of the Parliament of England for Plymouth
British military personnel of the War of the Quadruple Alliance